Dênggar or Danga is a village and township in the Tibet Autonomous Region of China. It lies at an altitude of 4,532 metres (14,872 feet).

See also
List of towns and villages in Tibet

Populated places in Shigatse
Township-level divisions of Tibet
Saga County